Sandbach School is a free school in Sandbach, Cheshire, north-west England. It was established in 1677 by local philanthropists, including Richard Lea, who donated the land for the school, and Francis Welles, who helped to fund the schoolhouse. It was located at Egerton Lodge, Middlewich Road, before moving into a new set of buildings designed by George Gilbert Scott in 1851. It became a private school in 1945, and a state-funded independent grammar school in 1955. It became a state-funded independent school accepting boys of all abilities in 1979. In 2011, it became one of the country's first free schools.

There are 1220 pupils in the school, aged 11–18. The lower school, years 7 to 11, is entirely boys, however, the sixth form is coeducational. The current headteacher is Sarah Burns, who assumed the role in 2008. In 2011, 96.7% of the students identified as White British, and 6.9% of students had some form of Special Educational Need. Two-thirds of pupils are from the Sandbach and Haslington area, with the remaining third coming from the Crewe area. The school is the largest provider of adult education in the area.

History

A school existed in Sandbach as early as 1578, when the York visitation returns referred to a schoolmaster in the town. In 1606, the parish register also mentioned a schoolmaster in the town. However, it was not until 1677 when the grammar school proper was founded by Richard Lea, after he gave a piece of land for the schoolhouse. Francis Welles and others paid for the construction of the schoolhouse. In 1718, a deed was drawn up that demonstrated how the school should be managed and gave instructions for the appointment of governors and a master. 20 poor boys of Sandbach were to be educated at the new school, and the second master was likely to have also been the parish curate.

By 1816, the school had 60 pupils and was located at Egerton Lodge, Middlewich Road. In 1848, a private Act of Parliament was passed that set out how the school should be better managed. An annual salary of £140 was set for the schoolmaster, and of £60 to the second master. From 1849, the school's buildings were replaced by buildings designed in the early English style by George Gilbert Scott. It entered these new buildings in 1851. By 1890, the school had a laboratory, gymnasium and swimming bath. In 1909, the school acquired eligibility for the Board of Education grants, however, in 1945, the government decided that the school should no longer have direct access to these grants. The governors chose independence rather than becoming a local education authority (LEA) school.

The school operated as an independent school until 1955, when it entered into a unique agreement with Cheshire County Council that it would maintain its independence and charitable status but operate as the boys' day grammar school in south-east Cheshire. In 1957, to help to alleviate the shortage of grammar school places in south-east Cheshire, the governors agreed with the local education authority to provide 60 places for boys based on residence, not ability. In 1976, these were increased in 180. In the same year, Sandbach School was first listed as a Grade II Listed building. 1979 saw the school enter into a new agreement with the LEA that it would have an all-ability intake of boys from a defined area of south-east Cheshire. In September 2011, Sandbach School became one of the first 24 free schools to open in the country.

School structure 
 
At the last Ofsted inspection, in 2008, the school had 1167 students. In 2011, it was reported the school had 1220 students and was likely to rise to its capacity of 1265 by 2012/13 as a result of "organic growth due to rising demographics". The main primary school feeders to Sandbach School are Sandbach Primary, Wheelock Primary, Haslington Primary, The Dingle Primary, St John's Primary, Elworth Hall Primary, Elworth C of E Primary and Offley Road Primary. There are six other secondary schools and sixth forms in a five-mile radius: Sandbach High School and Sixth Form College, Holmes Chapel Comprehensive School, Alsager School, Sir William Stanier School, Middlewich High School and Congleton High School.

Lower school 
In year 10 and 11, a range of GCSEs and vocational subjects are offered.

Sixth form 
At sixth form, the school offers AS-Levels, A-Levels and BTECs.

House System 

There are currently four Houses at Sandbach School, which students are grouped into. A student's House can be determined by the colour of the crest on their tie.

  Lea

  Welles

  Ward

 Craig

These Houses compete to win points each year which determines who will win the House Cup.

For a short period of time in the early 1980s, the school had six Houses. These were: Hall (Ward was renamed Hall during this period), Welles, Lea, Craig, Scott and Kent.

Adult education

Sandbach School Adult Education Department is the largest provider of adult education courses in South Cheshire, offering up to 100 courses on Tuesday, Wednesday and Thursday evenings.

Extra-curricular activities
The school has a wide range of extra-curricular activities including international mentors, reading club, war games club, languages club, many musical ensembles, drama/theatre, Duke of Edinburgh, rock climbing and many sports clubs.

There is also a Combined Cadet Force (CCF) contingent based at the school, which offers the vocational qualification of BTEC First Diploma in Public Service, which is worth four GCSEs in conjunction with the school. The contingent is run by Lt Col R.J. Ayres, a former teacher at the school.

Sports 

The school has a number of sports teams, including in rugby union, association football, field hockey, badminton, athletics, cricket, swimming, cross country, and golf.

The school has had success playing football in the Cheshire Schools FA competitions. In 2017–2018, the school won the U14 Hefin Roberts Cup and the U18 Don Ormes Cup for Schools. Historical results include winning the U18 Don Ormes Cup in 2011–2012, the U13 Redrow Cheshire Cup in 2015–2016, and the U15 Emberton Cup in 2011–2012.

In 2017, Sandbach School's U13 cricket team won the U13 Hill Hopkins Trophy of the Cheshire Schools Cricket Association, beating Birkenhead School. In 2015, the school won the U12 Campey Cup, beating King's School, Macclesfield. In 2011, the school won the U14 Lord's Taverners' Cricketer Cup, beating King's School, Chester.

Drama and performing arts
Sandbach School has an international reputation for drama and music, touring to Hong Kong, New Zealand and Brazil, and performing shows in the Edinburgh Fringe Festival. The school was awarded specialist arts college status in 2006. The school's theatrical director is John Lonsdale (awarded an MBE in the 2014 Queen's New Years Honours list); music is led by John Barber (principal trombonist with Foden's Band). The school's theatrical success led to the founding of a separate theatre group, the Ut Severis Seges Theatre Company (named after the school motto).

In Edinburgh, the school's 2004 performances of Macbeth and The Madness of King George III both garnered 4-star reviews within the fringe press.

Following this, in 2006 the performance of the original play Oedipus, written by former pupil and future teacher Andrew Cargill, was also given a 4-star rating in the magazine Three Weeks. The school also performed Shakespeare's A Midsummer Night's Dream. Ut Severis Seges also toured to the Edinburgh Fringe alongside the school theatre group in 2006, with a production of Amadeus.

A third tour of the Edinburgh Fringe took place in 2008, costing £20,000, with a new production of Oh! What A Lovely War, which gained a 5-star review, and 4-star performances by the school's Big Band.

The Sandbach School Big Band was formed in 2003. It has toured to Boston, USA and Berlin, and also performed at the finals of the National Jazz Festival 'Music for Youth', at Birmingham Conservatoire, and was a finalist at the 2007 National Festival of Music for Youth. In recent years the group has worked with many of the country's leading musicians including Georgie Fame. The Big Band have been winners of the Cheshire East Schools' Music Competition for the past 3 years (2010 to 2012).

Film
In 2007 the school hosted the British Youth Film Academy's production of the film The School That Roared, allowing school students a chance to work with film professionals and star in a feature film.

International links
The school is linked to schools across the world. Sandbach School gained the International Schools Award from the British Council, it has been granted from September 2007 to September 2010.
In October 2007 the senior rugby squad toured Italy.

Germany
The school band toured in Germany in October 2005, and formed a partnership with Leibniz Oberschule in Berlin. Since 2005, an exchange visit to Berlin and regular contact via e-mail and video conferencing has helped Sandbach pupils in their German studies.

Hong Kong
The school also has a long-term partnership with Fukien Secondary School in Kowloon, Hong Kong where some pupils performed in October 2006 and again - with a performance of "The King of Denmark" - in 2013. The schools collaborated at the Edinburgh Fringe in an event at the Royal College of Physicians of Edinburgh, where a 50-strong group from Fukien met over 100 Sandbach pupils and staff. Former Sandbach pupils have visited Fukien and taught there during their gap year, and a former Sandbach School teacher has also taught at Fukien.

United States
Sandbach School has toured to Dover High School in New Hampshire, sending football tours to Dover to play them and other schools in the area. In October 2004 and October 2007, joint football and music tours were arranged.

New Zealand
The school has a link with the National Youth Drama School, New Zealand.

Canada
The school has a link with Hugh McRoberts High School, in Vancouver, British Columbia, Canada

Notable former pupils

Alfred Barratt, barrister and philosopher
Will Cliff, Sale Sharks rugby player
Iain Coldham, professor of organic chemistry at the University of Sheffield
Vero Charles Driffield, chemical engineer
Sir David Eastwood, vice-chancellor of the University of Birmingham
Paul Franklin, visual effects supervisor
James Gaskell, Wasps RFC rugby player
Wilton Hack, Australian artist, pastor, traveller, utopist, and theosophist
Sol Heras, TV actor
Tom Holmes, Nottingham RFC rugby player
Lee Imiolek, Yorkshire Carnegie rugby player 
Duncan McCargo, professor of political science at the University of Copenhagen
Nick Powell, Stoke City footballer
Lee Oakes, TV actor
Gordon Slynn, Baron Slynn of Hadley, Second Senior Lord of Appeal in Ordinary 2000–2002
Nigel Stonier, record producer and songwriter
William Tempest, fashion designer
John Waite, BBC Radio 4 broadcaster
Paul Ware, Stoke City footballer
Peter Warren, archaeologist and emeritus professor at the University of Bristol
David Wrench, rugby union player for Harlequins FC and England 
Ewan Ashman, rugby union player for Sale Sharks and Scotland

See also

Listed buildings in Sandbach

References

External links
Ofsted report 2004
Ofsted report 2008

Ancient grammar schools of Cheshire
1677 establishments in England
Boys' schools in Cheshire
Free schools in England
Educational institutions established in the 1670s
Secondary schools in the Borough of Cheshire East
Schools in Sandbach
Listed buildings in Sandbach
Grade II listed buildings in Cheshire
George Gilbert Scott buildings